Peter Andrew Guy Sinon (born 30 October 1966) is a former Seychellois Cabinet Minister who served as Minister for Investment, Natural Resources and Industry from 2010 to 2015.

The son of Ministers Guy Sinon and Rita Sinon, Peter graduated from the University of East Anglia, where he was a Chevening Scholar, with a 2:2 in Development Studies in 1990, and an MA in Development Economics in 1996. He previously served as Seychelles High Commissioner to South Africa and Namibia, and was an Executive Director at the African Development Bank, during his time with the institution he represented Eritea, Ethiopia, Rwanda, Seychelles, Tanzania and Uganda.

References

1966 births
Living people
Alumni of the University of East Anglia
Seychellois diplomats
Seychellois economists
Government ministers of Seychelles
Chevening Scholars